Hank Berger  (1952 – October 31, 2006) was an American nightclub owner and a merchandiser of the remnants of the old Hollywood sign after it was replaced by a replica. Berger gave up on marketing the discarded cultural icon in pieces, and sold it in 2005 for $450,000 to a man named Dan Bliss 
.

After a stint in the Navy for a span, Berger was enrolled in the Cooper School of Art. Down the road he was known as "Dr. Disco". During this period Berger helmed a series of successful Cleveland nightclubs including the pioneering gay disco "Traxx" and "Phantasy Nightclub". In having opened, operated and brokered the sale of these clubs Berger is credited pioneering the development "the Rock n' Roll capitol of the world's neighborhood of
"The Flats".

Berger died on October 31, 2006 in Cleveland, Ohio at the age of 55 of asthma-related problems four days after having been hospitalized.

References

Nightclub owners
1952 births
2006 deaths
Respiratory disease deaths in Ohio
Deaths from asthma